Pascale Nadeau (born 2 April 1960) is a Canadian news presenter for Télévision de Radio-Canada from Quebec. Previously a daytime presenter for the all-news network Réseau de l'information and a local presenter for CBFT in Montreal, she has been the weekend presenter of the network's flagship newscast Le Téléjournal since September 2008.

She succeeded Céline Galipeau, who became the program's main weekday presenter following the retirement of Bernard Derome.

Biography
Nadeau is the daughter of the television journalist Pierre Nadeau; and the goddaughter of Peter Jennings, She studied special needs education at university, but left the field after a year and began working as a journalist for news radio station CKAC in Montreal. She subsequently moved to TQS and later to TV5, before joining Radio-Canada in 1996. Nadeau has two children, named Alexandra and Julien.

References

1960 births
Canadian television news anchors
Canadian television reporters and correspondents
French Quebecers
Living people
Canadian women television journalists
Journalists from Quebec
Canadian Broadcasting Corporation people
21st-century Canadian journalists